Rădulescu is a family name that is common in Romania.

Rădulescu may refer to any of the following people:

Sports
Alex Rădulescu, tennis player
Costel Rădulescu, soccer coach and manager
Mircea Rădulescu, soccer coach
Paula Rădulescu, handball player
Raul Rădulescu, futsal player

Politician
Victor Rădulescu-Pogoneanu, diplomat, politician, and former political prisoner
Gogu Rădulescu, communist politician
Ion Heliade Rădulescu, writer and politician
Iulian Rădulescu, Roma activist and politician
Aurel Rădulescu, cleric and politician
Constantin Rădulescu-Motru, philosopher and politician
Cristian Rădulescu, politician

Writer
Mihai Rădulescu, writer, art critic, and former political prisoner
Domnica Radulescu, Romanian-American writer
Marta Rădulescu, novelist
Neagu Rădulescu, writer
Nicolae G. Rădulescu-Niger, poet, playwright and novelist
Răzvan Rădulescu, screenwriter and novelist

Other
Edgar Rădulescu, general
Şerban Rădulescu-Zoner, historian, former political prisoner and civil society activist
Gheorghe Aurelian Rădulescu, chemist
Horațiu Rădulescu, composer
Ion A. Rădulescu-Pogoneanu, pedagogue
Andrei Rădulescu, judge
Dem Rădulescu, actor
Mihaela Rădulescu, television personality
Cristian Radulescu, United States Army Officer and former ice hockey player.

See also 
 Radu (given name)
 Radu (surname)
 Răducan (surname)
 Răducanu (surname)
 Rădeni (disambiguation)
 Rădești (disambiguation)
 Răduțești (disambiguation)
 Rădulești (disambiguation)

Romanian-language surnames
Patronymic surnames